KLBG may refer to:

 KLBG (FM), a radio station (95.5 FM) licensed to serve Lindsborg, Kansas, United States
 KLBG-LP, a defunct radio station (92.5 FM) formerly licensed to serve Glide, Oregon, United States
 KJMJ, a radio station (580 AM) licensed to serve Alexandria, Louisiana, United States, which held the call sign KLBG from 1995 to 2000
 Kalaburagi railway station, a railway station in the Kalaburagi district of the Indian state of Karnataka, with the station code KLBG